The 1931 All-Eastern football team consists of American football players chosen by various selectors as the best players at each position among the Eastern colleges and universities during the 1931 college football season. 

Four players were named to the first team by the Associated Press, United Press, and Central Press Association. They were quarterback Barry Wood of Harvard; end John Orsi of Colgate; guard Jim Zyntell of Holy Cross; and center Ralph Daugherty of Pittsburgh.

All-Eastern selections

Quarterbacks
 Barry Wood, Harvard (AP-1, UP-1, CP)

Halfbacks
 Bart Viviano, Cornell (AP-1, UP-1)
 Albie Booth, Yale (AP-1)
 Ray Stecker, Army (UP-1)
 Jim Murphy, Fordham (CP)
 Joe Moran, Syracuse (CP)

Fullbacks
 Clarke Hinkle, Bucknell (AP-1, UP-1)
 Carl Perina, Penn (CP)

Ends
 John Orsi, Colgate (AP-1, UP-1, CP)
 Paul Riblett, Penn (AP-1, UP-1)
 Herster Barres, Yale (CP)

Tackles
 John Price, Army (AP-1, UP-1)
 Jess  Quatse, Pittsburgh (UP-1, CP)
 MacMurdo, Pittsburgh (AP-1)
 Jack Price, Army (CP)

Guards
 Jim Zyntell, Holy Cross (AP-1, UP-1, CP)
 Myerson, Harvard (AP-1)
 Steve Grenda, Columbia (UP-1)
 Bill Hoffman, Dartmouth (CP)

Centers
 Ralph Daugherty, Pittsburgh (AP-1, UP-1, CP)

Key
 AP = Associated Press
 UP = United Press
 CP = Central Press Association, selected by the football captains of the Eastern teams

See also
 1931 College Football All-America Team

References

All-Eastern
All-Eastern college football teams